Mooi River is a small town situated at 1,389m above sea level and 160km from the coast in KwaZulu-Natal, South Africa. The first European settlement in the area was at Mooi River Drift in 1852. This was formally named Weston in 1866 after the first Governor of Natal, Martin West.

History
In 1879, an Irishman named Alexander Lawrence purchased the farm "Grantleigh" upstream from Weston, on the banks of the Mooi River. "Mooirivier" is Afrikaans for "pretty river". 

In 1884, the railway line from Durban, on the coast, to Johannesburg, in the interior, reached the area and was built across Alexander Lawrence's land. He subsequently laid out and establish the village of Lawrenceville on his farm "Grantleigh" and so is known as "The Father of Mooi River". In 1921, the village was renamed Mooi River when it was declared a town.

Geography
It lies on the N3 national road and rail routes between Johannesburg and Durban. Although the railway station is no longer used for passengers, goods are still being handled. There is a toll plaza located on the N3 at Mooi River.

Education
Six schools are serving the Mooi River municipal area with numerous others further from town that serve the traditional farm labourer communities. The six main schools are:
 Treverton Preparatory School and College, a private school of about 600 students. In the hills of the small game park within Treverton there lie some trenches used in the Boer wars. From these the Boers observed English movements at Weston - their remount depot.
 Weston Agricultural College, a public agricultural school of good reputation. There is great rugby rivalry between them and Treverton.
 Mooi River Primary in the centre of town.
 Ai Kajee Primary.
 Bruntville Primary serving the Bruntville area
 Emnyezaneni Secondary school serving the Bruntville area

Economy
The urban economy of the area is currently based primarily on retail entrepreneurship, tourism and supporting the local agricultural community.  Previously, the backbone of the urban economy had been Mooi River Textiles which finally closed in 2002 after years of downsizing. The decline of the textile industry is being reversed however with large foreign investment from the Far-East.   

The rural economy is based on agriculture and tourism. The main farming categories are dairy and equine. Local farmers are supported by the Mooi River Farmers' Association.

Tourism
Mooi River forms an important part of the Midlands Meander tourism route.

Notable people
 Candice Swanepoel – supermodel best known for her work with Victoria's Secret. In 2012, she came in 10th on the Forbes top-earning models list.
 Sun-El Musician – whose real name is Sanele Sithole, was born in the small town of Mooi River in the Midlands of KwaZulu-Natal. A music producer and DJ. Akanamali is the first single on his EP, Sun-El is currently based in the heart of Johannesburg where his music career has progressed.
 Kwazi Mshengu – KwaZulu-Natal MEC for Education, member of the KwaZulu-Natal Legislature: 2019-present
 Christopher Pappas (South African politician) – member of the KwaZulu-Natal Legislature: 2019-present
 Lars Georg Svensson – cardiac surgeon, chairman of the heart and vascular institute at Cleveland Clinic, US.
 Vusi Khanyile – businessman, investor and founding Chairman of Thebe Investment Holdings

References

External links

Populated places in the Mpofana Local Municipality